Nils-Eric Claes Johansson (born 13 January 1980) is a Swedish former professional footballer who played as a defender. Born in Stockholm, Johansson signed with FC Bayern Munich in 1997. He then went on to represent 1. FC Nürnberg, Blackburn Rovers, and Leicester City before returning to his native Sweden and the club AIK in 2007. He made 371 appearances for AIK until his retirement from football in 2018 due to a heart condition. He won three caps for the Sweden national team in 2002.

Club career

Early career 
Initially on the books at IFK Viksjö, IF Brommapojkarna, AIK, and Bayern Munich, he moved to 1. FC Nürnberg in August 2000, before several clubs across Europe, including Blackburn Rovers, claimed special interest in the player.

Blackburn Rovers 
He moved to Blackburn in October 2001 for a fee of £2,700,000, signing a four-year contract. He made his debut in a 4–1 loss against Liverpool. His next match was a 7–1 victory against West Ham United. He made his 75th appearance for Blackburn during the 2003–04 season. However, following Mark Hughes' arrival as Blackburn manager, he found first team chances few and far between. In his time at Blackburn he started in the 2002 Football League Cup Final in which they beat Tottenham Hotspur 2–1. He scored twice during his spell at Blackburn: once against Manchester City in the League Cup and once against Barnsley in the FA Cup.

Leicester City 
He was released by Blackburn at the end of the 2004–05 season and joined Leicester City on a free transfer at the start of the 2005–06 season. His first goal for Leicester came in a 1–0 win against Cardiff in the League Cup. Johansson's only league goal was a last minute winner against Preston in the 2006–07 season, which all but guaranteed Leicester's survival in the Championship.

AIK 
He was released by Leicester in May 2007 and shortly afterwards he signed for Swedish outfit AIK, where he was eligible from 1 July. In 2009, he helped the team win Allsvenskan for the first time in 11 years.

On 18 February 2018, it was announced that he would retire, effective immediately, due to a heart condition. He played a total of 371 competitive games for the club.

International career 
After having appeared for more than 70 times for the Sweden U17, U19, and U21 teams, Johansson made his full international debut for Sweden on 21 August 2002 in a friendly game against Russia in which he replaced Johan Mjällby in the 66th minute. Later that year, he made two more appearances in friendly games against Portugal and the Czech Republic.

After more than a ten-year absence from the national team, he was called up as a replacement for Oscar Wendt for the 2014 FIFA World Cup qualifiers against Austria and the Faroe Islands, but did not play.

In total, Johansson won three caps for the Sweden.

Career statistics

Honours
Bayern Munich
Bundesliga: 1999–00
DFB-Pokal: 1999–00

1. FC Nürnberg
2. Bundesliga: 2000–01

Blackburn Rovers
Football League Cup: 2002

AIK
Allsvenskan: 2009
Svenska Cupen: 2009
Svenska Supercupen: 2010

References

External links
 
 Nils-Eric Johansson at EliteFootball.com
 
 

1980 births
Living people
Footballers from Stockholm
Association football defenders
1. FC Nürnberg players
AIK Fotboll players
FC Bayern Munich footballers
FC Bayern Munich II players
Blackburn Rovers F.C. players
Swedish expatriate sportspeople in the United Kingdom
Swedish expatriate sportspeople in Germany
Expatriate footballers in England
Expatriate footballers in Germany
Leicester City F.C. players
Premier League players
English Football League players
Sweden international footballers
Sweden under-21 international footballers
Sweden youth international footballers
Swedish expatriate footballers
Swedish footballers
Allsvenskan players
Bundesliga players
2. Bundesliga players
Regionalliga players